Orithyia sinica, sometimes called tiger crab or the tiger face crab, is a "singularly unusual" species of crab, whose characteristics warrant its separation into a separate genus, family and even superfamily, having previously been included in the Dorippoidea or Leucosioidea. Its larvae, for instance, are unlike those of any other crab.

Description
O. sinica is a distinctive species, with stripes on the legs, and prominent eyespots on the carapace; the females' abdomen is unusually narrow, leaving the vulvae exposed. The legs are flattened at the end, and this is an adaptation to digging, not swimming.

Distribution and fishery
O. sinica is found along the coast of mainland Asia from South Korea to Hong Kong, but is missing from the nearby islands, such as Taiwan, the Ryukyu Islands and Japan, even though the intervening waters are shallow and the crab's larvae are planktonic. Throughout its range, O. sinica is fished on a small scale and commands high prices.

Etymology
The name Orithyia (also spelt Orithuja) commemorates Orithyia, daughter of Erechtheus, King of Athens.

References

External links 

 

Crabs
Edible crustaceans
Commercial crustaceans
Crustaceans described in 1771
Crustaceans of the Pacific Ocean
Arthropods of Korea
Arthropods of China
Marine fauna of East Asia
Invertebrates of Hong Kong
Taxa named by Carl Linnaeus